Brian Sperber is a rock producer/sound engineer/mixer. He has spent the bulk of his career at Electric Lady Studios in New York City.  After years as an audio engineer for artists as varied as Whitney Houston, Patti Smith, De La Soul, and Ozzy Osbourne, he moved to the post-production side of the recording process.

Sperber has mixed for rock bands 3 Doors Down, Guided by Voices, and Dinosaur Jr. In recent years he has focused more on production for bands like Carpark North and Metropolis America. He is a multi-instrumentalist and has played guitar and keyboards for several of his artists' projects, including Alter Bridge.

References
http://www.allmusic.com/artist/brian-sperber-mn0000519512
http://www.discogs.com/artist/Brian+Sperber

American record producers
American audio engineers
Living people
Year of birth missing (living people)